Qaleh Sangi (also Romanized as Qal‘eh Sangī) is a village in Balaband Rural District, in the Central District of Fariman County, Razavi Khorasan Province, Iran. At the 2006 census, its population was 474, in 104 families.

References 

Populated places in Fariman County